John Joseph Timoney (23 May 1909 – 16 May 1961) was an Irish Clann na Poblachta politician. A solicitor by profession, he was elected to Dáil Éireann as a Clann na Poblachta Teachta Dála (TD) for the Tipperary South constituency at the 1948 general election. He lost his seat at the 1951 general election.

References

1909 births
1961 deaths
Clann na Poblachta TDs
Members of the 13th Dáil
Politicians from County Tipperary
Irish solicitors
20th-century Irish lawyers